Spanish Communist Workers' Party may refer to:

Spanish Communist Workers' Party (1921)
Spanish Communist Workers' Party (1973)